Maly Dor is a rural locality (a village) in Kichmegnskoye Rural Settlement, Kichmengsko-Gorodetsky District, Vologda Oblast, Russia. The population was 3 as of 2002.

Geography 
Maly Dor is located 41 km northeast of Kichmengsky Gorodok (the district's administrative centre) by road. Shemyachkino is the nearest rural locality.

References 

Rural localities in Kichmengsko-Gorodetsky District